Renewal is the sixth album by German thrash metal band Kreator, released in 1992. It's their first "experimental" album, as in this release Kreator incorporated industrial music influences in their songwriting, as well as featuring a groove metal sound. It is also the last album to feature original bassist Rob Fioretti. The song "Karmic Wheel" contains audio samples from the suicide of R. Budd Dwyer. 

A music video was made for the title track.

Release
In March 2018, German record label Noise released a remastered edition of the album and made it available on CD and vinyl and as digital download. The release contains three bonus tracks and liner notes.

Track listing

Personnel

Kreator
 Mille Petrozza – vocals, guitar
 Frank Gosdzik – guitar
 Rob Fioretti – bass
 Ventor – drums, programming

Production
 Kreator – producers
 Tom Morris – producer, engineer, mixing
 Mark Prator, Brian Bonscoter – engineers
 Karl Ulrich Walterbach – executive producer

2018 reissue production
 Steve Hammond – compilation
 Andy Pearce, Matt Worthams – mastering
 Thomas Ewerhard, Jan Meininghaus – art and design
 Holger Stratmann,  Markus Müller – additional photos
 Malcolm Dome  – sleeve notes

References

Kreator albums
1992 albums
Albums with cover art by Dave McKean
Noise Records albums
Industrial metal albums
Albums recorded at Morrisound Recording